German submarine U-605 was a Type VIIC U-boat built for Nazi Germany's Kriegsmarine for service during World War II.
She was laid down on 12 March 1941 by Blohm & Voss, Hamburg as yard number 581, launched on 27 November 1941 and commissioned on 15 January 1942 under Oberleutnant zur See Herbert-Viktor Schütze.

Design
German Type VIIC submarines were preceded by the shorter Type VIIB submarines. U-605 had a displacement of  when at the surface and  while submerged. She had two shafts and two  propellers.

U-605 was fitted with five  torpedo tubes (four fitted at the bow and one at the stern), fourteen torpedoes, one  SK C/35 naval gun, 220 rounds, and a  C/30 anti-aircraft gun. The boat had a complement of between forty-four and sixty.

Service history
The boat's career began with training at 5th U-boat Flotilla on 15 January 1942, followed by active service on 1 August 1942 as part of the 9th Flotilla. Just three months later, she transferred to the 29th Flotilla, operating out of La Spezia, for operations in the Mediterranean Sea for the remainder of her service.

Wolfpacks
U-605 took part in three wolfpacks, namely:
 Steinbrinck (7 – 11 August 1942)
 Lohs (11 – 26 August 1942)
 Tümmler (1 – 11 October 1942)

Fate
U-605 was sunk on 14 November 1942 in the Mediterranean Sea in position , by depth charges from a RAF Hudson bomber. All hands were lost.

Summary of raiding history

See also
 Mediterranean U-boat Campaign (World War II)

References

Bibliography

External links

German Type VIIC submarines
1941 ships
U-boats commissioned in 1942
Ships lost with all hands
U-boats sunk in 1942
U-boats sunk by depth charges
U-boats sunk by British aircraft
World War II shipwrecks in the Mediterranean Sea
World War II submarines of Germany
Ships built in Hamburg
Maritime incidents in November 1942